Falcileptoneta is a genus of East Asian leptonetids that was first described by T. Komatsu in 1970.

Species
 it contains forty-nine species and one subspecies, found only in Korea and Japan:
Falcileptoneta aichiensis Irie & Ono, 2007 – Japan
Falcileptoneta amakusaensis Irie & Ono, 2005 – Japan
Falcileptoneta asuwana (Nishikawa, 1981) – Japan
Falcileptoneta baegunsanensis Xu, Kim, Yoo, Nam & Li, 2019 – Korea
Falcileptoneta bifurca Seo, 2015 – Korea
Falcileptoneta boeunensis Seo, 2015 – Korea
Falcileptoneta caeca Yaginuma, 1972 – Japan
Falcileptoneta chiakensis Seo, 2015 – Korea
Falcileptoneta coreana (Paik & Namkung, 1969) – Korea
Falcileptoneta cornuta Seo, 2015 – Korea
Falcileptoneta digitalis Seo, 2015 – Korea
Falcileptoneta geumdaensis Seo, 2016 – Korea
Falcileptoneta geumsanensis Seo, 2016 – Korea
Falcileptoneta gotoensis Irie & Ono, 2005 – Japan
Falcileptoneta hansanensis Seo, 2015 – Korea
Falcileptoneta higoensis (Irie & Ono, 2003) – Japan
Falcileptoneta hwanseonensis (Namkung, 1987) – Korea
Falcileptoneta inabensis (Nishikawa, 1982) – Japan
Falcileptoneta inagakii Irie & Ono, 2011 – Japan
Falcileptoneta iriei (Komatsu, 1967) – Japan
Falcileptoneta japonica (Simon, 1893) – Japan
Falcileptoneta juwangensis Seo, 2015 – Korea
Falcileptoneta kugoana (Komatsu, 1961) – Japan
Falcileptoneta maewhaensis Seo, 2016 – Korea
Falcileptoneta melanocomata (Kishida, 1939) – Japan
Falcileptoneta moakensis Seo, 2015 – Korea
Falcileptoneta musculina (Komatsu, 1961) – Japan
Falcileptoneta naejangenesis Seo, 2015 – Korea
Falcileptoneta odaesanensis Xu, Kim, Yoo, Nam & Li, 2019 – Korea
Falcileptoneta ogatai Irie & Ono, 2007 – Japan
Falcileptoneta okinawaensis Komatsu, 1972 – Japan (Okinawa)
Falcileptoneta satsumaensis Irie & Ono, 2005 – Japan
Falcileptoneta secula (Namkung, 1987) – Korea
Falcileptoneta simboggulensis (Paik, 1971) – Korea
Falcileptoneta soboensis Irie & Ono, 2005 – Japan
Falcileptoneta speciosa (Komatsu, 1957) – Japan
Falcileptoneta striata (Oi, 1952) (type) – Japan
Falcileptoneta s. fujisana Yaginuma, 1972 – Japan
Falcileptoneta sunchangensis Seo, 2016 – Korea
Falcileptoneta tajimiensis Irie & Ono, 2011 – Japan
Falcileptoneta tofacea Yaginuma, 1972 – Japan
Falcileptoneta tsushimensis (Yaginuma, 1970) – Japan
Falcileptoneta uenoi (Taginuma, 1963) – Japan
Falcileptoneta umyeonsanensis Xu, Kim, Yoo, Nam & Li, 2019 – Korea
Falcileptoneta unmunensis Seo, 2015 – Korea
Falcileptoneta usihanana (Komatsu, 1961) – Japan
Falcileptoneta yamauchii (Nishikawa, 1982) – Japan
Falcileptoneta yebongsanensis (Kim, Lee & Namkung, 2004) – Korea
Falcileptoneta yongdamgulensis (Paik & Namkung, 1969) – Korea
Falcileptoneta zenjoenis (Komatsu, 1965) – Japan

See also
 List of Leptonetidae species

References

Araneomorphae genera
Leptonetidae
Spiders of Asia